Tamara Faye Messner (née LaValley, formerly Bakker ; March 7, 1942 – July 20, 2007) was an American evangelist, singer, author, talk show host, and television personality. She gained notice for her work with The PTL Club, a televangelist program she co-founded with her husband Jim Bakker in 1974. They had hosted their own puppet show series for local programming in the early 1960s; Messner also had a career as a recording artist. In 1978, she and Bakker built Heritage USA, a Christian theme park.

Messner garnered significant publicity when Jim Bakker was indicted, convicted, and imprisoned on numerous counts of fraud and conspiracy in 1989, resulting in the dissolution of The PTL Club. She divorced Bakker in 1992 and married Roe Messner. She was diagnosed with colon cancer in 1996, from which she suffered intermittently for over a decade before dying of the disease in 2007.

During her career Messner was noted for her eccentric and glamorous persona, as well as for moral views that diverged from those of many mainstream evangelists, particularly her advocacy for LGBT persons and reaching out to HIV/AIDS patients at the height of the AIDS epidemic. She released three autobiographies during her lifetime, I Gotta Be Me in 1978, Tammy: Telling it My Way in 1996 and I Will Survive and You Will Too! in 2003.

Biography

1942–1959: Early life
She was born Tamara Faye LaValley in International Falls, Minnesota, to Pentecostal preachers Rachel Minnie (née Fairchild; 1919–1992) and Carl Oliver LaValley.

Her parents were married in 1941. Shortly after she was born, a painful divorce soured her mother against other ministers, alienating her from the church. Both of her parents remarried, her mother to Fred Willard Grover, forming a large blended family, of which she was the oldest.

1960–1973: Marriage to Jim Bakker; early work
In 1960, she met Jim Bakker while they were students at North Central Bible College in Minneapolis, Minnesota. Tammy Faye worked in a boutique for a time while Jim found work in a restaurant inside a department store in Minneapolis. They were married on April 1, 1961. The next year, they moved to South Carolina, where they began their ministry together, initially traveling around the United States; Jim preached, while Tammy sang songs and played the accordion. In 1970, she gave birth to their daughter Tammy Sue "Sissy" Bakker, and in 1975 gave birth to their son Jamie Charles Bakker.

Jim and Tammy had been involved with television from the time of their departure from Minneapolis until they moved to the Charlotte area via Virginia Beach, Virginia, where they were founding members of The 700 Club. While in Portsmouth, they were hosts of the popular children's show Jim and Tammy. They then created a puppet ministry for children on Pat Robertson's Christian Broadcasting Network (CBN), which ran from 1964 to 1973.

1974–1987: The PTL Club
Messner co-founded (with Bakker) The PTL Club (Praise The Lord) in 1974, a televangelist Christian news program that they initially hosted in an abandoned furniture store in Charlotte. The series mixed "glitzy entertainment with down-home family values" and preached a "'prosperity gospel' which put a divine seal of approval on both the growing affluence of American evangelicals and the showy lifestyles of their television ministers." The PTL Club soon grew into its own network and a corporate enterprise within a year of its founding, generating $120 million annually in the 1970s. In 1978, Messner and Bakker used $200 million of PTL funds to build Heritage USA, a Christian retreat and theme park that, at the time, ranked alongside Disney World and Disneyland as one of the most popular theme parks in the United States.

Throughout the series, Messner provided a sentimental and emotive touch to stories, and also often sang Christian songs. She was also noted for her candid discussion of topics considered taboo amongst many of her Evangelist peers, ranging from penile implants to acceptance and compassion for the LGBT community.

At the height of the AIDS epidemic in the mid-1980s, Messner emotionally interviewed Steven Pieters, a gay Christian minister with AIDS on "Tammy's House Party," a segment of The PTL Club, during which they discussed his sexuality, coming out, diagnosis with AIDS, and the death of his partner. During the program, Messner emotionally addressed her viewership, saying: "How sad that we as Christians, who are to be the salt of the earth, we who are supposed to be able to love everyone, are afraid so badly of an AIDS patient that we will not go up and put our arm around them and tell them that we care." Throughout the AIDS epidemic, Messner advocated for viewers of The PTL Club to follow Christ and show compassion and pray for the ill, and also invited drug addicts onto the show to interview them about substance abuse. In 1987, it was reported that Messner was herself being treated for a prescription drug addiction.

Messner's friend, the Reverend Mel White, commented on her presence on The PTL Club:

1988–1996: Collapse of The PTL Club and aftermath

The Bakkers' control of PTL collapsed in 1987 after revelations that $287,000 had been paid from the organization to buy the silence of Jessica Hahn, who claims Jim Bakker raped her. In his 1997 book, I Was Wrong, Bakker disputed Hahn's account, claiming that he was "set up" and that their sex was consensual. The revelations invited scrutiny of the Bakkers, and charges made about their opulent lives, including media reports of an air-conditioned doghouse at their Tega Cay, South Carolina, lakefront parsonage as well as gold-plated bathroom fixtures, dominated newscasts in the 1980s. When asked about her income, Messner told reporters in 1986: "We don't get what Johnny Carson makes, and we work a lot harder than him." The couple's Tega Cay home was later sold by the ministry and burned to the ground not long thereafter. Bakker wrote in his book I Was Wrong that he watched the home burn on live television while incarcerated.  The Charlotte Observer subsequently ran exposés of PTL's finances and management practices. PTL went bankrupt after being taken over by Lynchburg, Virginia-based Baptist televangelist Jerry Falwell, who offered to step in following the scandals in 1988.

Messner stood by Bakker through the scandal, including several instances when she cried on camera. In 1989 Bakker was sentenced to 45 years in prison on 24 fraud and conspiracy counts (he served 5). In 1992, while Bakker was still in prison, Messner filed for divorce, saying in a letter to the New Covenant Church in Orlando, Florida: "For years I have been pretending that everything is all right, when in fact I hurt all the time... I cannot pretend anymore."

On October 3, 1993, she married property developer Roe Messner in Rancho Mirage, California, after he divorced his own wife. They moved to the Charlotte suburb of Matthews, North Carolina. Tammy and Roe were neighbors to Christian recording star and friend David L Cook. Roe, who had a contracting business, Messner Enterprises in Andover, Kansas, had built much of Heritage USA as well as many large churches and had been a family friend to the Bakkers throughout the PTL years. Roe was the one who produced the money for the $265,000 payment to Hahn, later billing PTL for work never completed on the Jerusalem Amphitheater at Heritage USA. In the Bakkers' fraud trial, Roe testified for Bakker's defense saying that Falwell had sent Messner to the Bakker home in Palm Springs, California, to make an offer to "keep quiet."

In 1996, Roe was convicted of bankruptcy fraud, having claimed to owe nearly $30 million to over 300 creditors in 1990. As he faced sentencing in 1996, he said he could not afford to treat his prostate cancer because he lacked health insurance. He was sentenced to and served 27 months in prison.

The same year, Messner published her autobiography, Tammy: Telling It My Way, and she co-hosted a TV talk show titled The Jim J. and Tammy Faye Show with Jim J. Bullock.

1997–2007: Later life and illness
As her first husband was jailed and Messner then became diagnosed with colon cancer, she re-entered the public eye in a series of books, movies and television appearances.

She appeared twice on The Drew Carey Show in 1996 and 1999, playing the mother of character Mimi Bobeck (Kathy Kinney), who was also known for wearing excessive amounts of makeup. On September 11, 2003, Messner published a new autobiography, I Will Survive... and You Will, Too!, in which she described her battles with cancer and her life with Roe Messner.

She was the subject of a documentary titled The Eyes of Tammy Faye (2000), narrated by RuPaul, and a follow-up film titled Tammy Faye: Death Defying (2004).

Despite her background in Christian fundamentalism, Messner became a gay icon after parting from PTL, appearing in Gay Pride marches with figures such as Lady Bunny and Bruce Vilanch. Unlike many American Christian fundamentalists she "had long refused to denounce homosexuals" and also expressed compassion toward, and urged support for Americans with HIV/AIDS when it was still a much feared and unknown disease. In the 1980s she interviewed an AIDS patient on her program, "making an impassioned plea to Christians to love and accept their gay brethren." She was benevolently referred to as "the ultimate drag queen," and said in her last interview with Larry King that, "When I wentwhen we lost everything, it was the gay people that came to my rescue, and I will always love them for that."

In early 2004, she appeared on the second season of the VH1 reality television series The Surreal Life. The show chronicled a twelve-day period wherein she, Ron Jeremy, Vanilla Ice, Traci Bingham, Erik Estrada, and Trishelle Cannatella lived together in a Los Angeles house and were assigned various tasks and activities.

Together, the six put on a children's play and managed a restaurant for a day. She also attended a book signing for her best-seller, I Will Survive... And You Will Too.

At the end of the show, Messner said she thought of Vanilla Ice and Trishelle Cannatella as her children and could relate to them deeply because she had similar feelings and problems when she was their age.

In July 2007, on more solid financial footing, the Messners relocated to Loch Lloyd, Missouri, a suburb of Kansas City. Jim Bakker had relocated his operations to Branson, Missouri, in 2003. She told Entertainment Tonight they had moved to the "dream house" to be closer to Roe's children and grandchildren from his first marriage.

Death
Messner's 11 years with cancer were highly publicized. She was diagnosed with colon cancer in March 1996, and the disease went into remission by the end of that year.

In March 2004, Messner made an appearance on Larry King Live and announced that she had inoperable lung cancer and would soon begin chemotherapy. She continued to receive chemotherapy throughout mid-2004. In November 2004, also on Larry King Live, she announced that she was cancer-free once again. She described the details of her chemotherapy and continued to appear regularly on King's show.

A television documentary of her struggle with cancer was produced in 2004. It was on King's program again that she announced in July 2005 that her cancer had returned.

In March 2006, Messner appeared again on Larry King Live. She said she was continuing to suffer from lung cancer, which had reached stage 4, and that she was continuing to receive treatment for it. She also mentioned having difficulty swallowing food, suffering from panic attacks, and enduring substantial weight loss. As her health continued to worsen, a "Talk of the Town" article in an October 2006 issue of The New Yorker stated that she was dying in hospice care, and a December 2006 article in Walter Scott's column in Parade reported that her son Jay was "at a North Carolina hospice with his mom, [who is] gravely ill with colon cancer".

Messner was a guest by phone on Larry King Live in December 2006, and said that she was receiving hospice care in her home. She appeared in her son Jay's documentary series One Punk Under God, wherein they talked about her cancer treatments. In one episode, she required the use of oxygen in order to talk.

In May 2007, she issued a statement on her website saying that chemotherapy had stopped, and she urged her fans to continue to pray for her. The story was reported on NBC's The Today Show, and a feature in which fans and well-wishers could post get-well messages to Tammy was added to her website.

On July 18, 2007, Messner made her final appearance on Larry King Live. At the time, she said she weighed 65 pounds (29.5 kg) and was unable to eat solid food. Messner's husband later said that he believed she chose to do the interview to say a final goodbye to her fans.

On July 20, 2007, Messner died at her home in Loch Lloyd, near Kansas City, Missouri, after an eleven-year bout with cancer. She was 65 years old. A family service was held on the morning of July 21, at the Messner family plot in Waldron, Kansas. The ceremony was officiated by Rev. Randy McCain, the pastor of Open Door Community Church in Sherwood, Arkansas. According to CNN, the family requested that King officially report the news of her death. Her remains were cremated and her ashes were returned to Waldron Cemetery where they were subsequently buried.

Legacy
In June 2006, a stage musical titled The Gospel According to Tammy Faye opened at the Cincinnati Fringe Festival and was subsequently developed as a larger professional production. The show features songs by J. T. Buck and a book by Fernando Dovalina. The musical is described as a fantasia which takes a balanced and fair look at its subject. The impetus for the show was provided by a lengthy interview that Messner gave the authors in March 2005. The musical aired in August 2006 in Portland, Oregon and Hood River, Oregon, and it was presented on stage at Houston's Alley Theatre at the end of July 2007 under direction of Les R. Wood. Industry readings presented by the Columbia Gorge Repertory Company were held at the Manhattan Theatre Club in December 2007, the cast including Tony nominee Sally Mayes and veteran Broadway performers William Youmans, Ken Land, Julie Foldesi, James T. Lane and Heather Parcells. The readings were directed by Mindy Cooper. Seth Farber provided musical direction.

Another musical following her life, titled Big Tent, debuted in May 2007, at off-Broadway's New World Stages, in New York City. The show features music and lyrics by Ben Cohn and Sean McDaniel, a book by Jeffery Self, and direction by Ryan J. Davis. A star-studded concert of songs from the show opened in February 2008, at New York's Metropolitan Room.

A play about her final hours, Tammy Faye's Final Audition by Merri Biechler, premiered at the Cincinnati Fringe Festival in June 2015. The play takes place in a fevered dream at the end of her life, wherein she enlists the men in her life for one final TV talk show audition.

A musical about the life of BeBe Winans, Born for This, debuted on June 25, 2018, at the Emerson Cutler Majestic Theatre in Boston, Massachusetts. Tammy Faye and Jim Bakker appear as supporting characters who give BeBe and his sister CeCe their first big break as singers on The PTL Club.

Broadway actress Kristin Chenoweth is reportedly planning a musical based on Messner's life.

In the 2021 movie The Eyes of Tammy Faye, based on the 2000 documentary of the same name, Jessica Chastain plays Tammy Faye and Andrew Garfield plays her husband Jim. The Eyes of Tammy Faye opened on September 17, 2021. Chastain won a Critics Choice Award, a Screen Actors Guild Award, and the Academy Award for Best Actress for her performance.

British playwright James Graham also wrote the book for a new musical about Tammy Faye, with music by Elton John and lyrics by Jake Shears. The musical, titled Tammy Faye, opened in October 2022 at the Almeida Theatre in London, directed by Rupert Goold.

Select discography

Bibliography
I Gotta Be Me  (1978), 
Run to the Roar (1985), 
Tammy: Telling It My Way (1996), 
I Will Survive...and You Will Too! (2003),

References

Further reading

External links
 Tammy Faye's Official Website and blog 
 National Public Radio All Things Considered. The Re-Invention of Tammy Faye: Former Christian Broadcasting Queen Has New Gay Following June 20, 2002 (Online article with audio of ATC story and video clip of film The Eyes of Tammy Faye)
 Tammy Faye Messner Interview at Archive of American Television
 
 
 

1942 births
2007 deaths
20th-century American women writers
Actresses from Minnesota
American autobiographers
American Christian writers
American evangelicals
American women singer-songwriters
American Pentecostal pastors
American performers of Christian music
American puppeteers
American television actresses
American television evangelists
American television talk show hosts
American women in business
Deaths from lung cancer in Missouri
Deaths from colorectal cancer
Women Christian clergy
American LGBT rights activists
Participants in American reality television series
People from Cass County, Missouri
Musicians from Charlotte, North Carolina
People from International Falls, Minnesota
Musicians from Minneapolis
Religious scandals
Writers from Minnesota
North Central University alumni
Women autobiographers
20th-century American singers
Singer-songwriters from Missouri
Singer-songwriters from Minnesota
People from Andover, Kansas
20th-century American women singers
People from Matthews, North Carolina
American women non-fiction writers
20th-century American actresses
20th-century American clergy
21st-century American women
Singer-songwriters from North Carolina
Singer-songwriters from Kansas